The Shoshone, also spelled Shoshoni, are a Native American people.

Shoshone and Shoshoni may also refer to:

Places
Shoshone, California
Shoshone, Idaho
Shoshone County, Idaho
Shoshone Falls, a waterfall in Idaho
Shoshoni, Wyoming
Shoshone Basin region of Wyoming
Shoshone National Forest in Wyoming
Shoshone River, a river in northwestern Wyoming
Shoshone Generating Station, a hydroelectric power plant on the Colorado River in Glenwood Springs, Colorado

Other
Shoshoni language, Uto-Aztecan language spoken by the Shoshone people
Shoshone pupfish, a nearly extinct species of fish that was named by Shoshone
Shoshone, nickname of the MŠK Žilina association football club and its supporters
 Shoshone (Snake River sternwheeler)
 USS Shoshone, ships of the name
 Shoshone (train), a passenger train operated in the Western United States